Old Trick New Dog is a 1998 album from David Cassidy on his own Slamajama Records label. In addition to new songs, it also features several remakes of songs from The Partridge Family. The single lifted from the album – No Bridge I Wouldn't Cross – was an Adult Contemporary Top 25 hit in the USA. The track You Were The One was co-written by David Cassidy and Tony Romeo who wrote many of the most popular songs for Cassidy and The Partridge Family in the 1970s, including I Think I Love You, Summer Days, I Am A Clown and Sing Me.

Track listing
 "No Bridge I Wouldn't Cross"
 "I Think I Love You"
 "You Were the One"
 "Let Her Go"
 "I Can Feel Your Heartbeat"
 "I Woke Up In Love This Morning"
 "(Whatever Happened To) Peace, Love & Happiness"
 "Sheltered in Your Arms"
 "Show and Tell"
 "Ricky's Tune"
 "I Think I Love You [Groove Mix]" [Bonus track]

David Cassidy albums
1998 albums